Thrishna is a 1981 Indian Malayalam film written by M. T Vasudevan Nair , directed by I. V. Sasi and produced by Rosamma George. The film has musical score by Shyam. The film stars Mammootty, Rajyalakshmi, Swapna and Kaviyoor Ponnamma in the lead roles. The film gave Mammootty his major break as a solo hero. The film tells the story of Das (Mammootty), who is a rich playboy and his relationships with his callgirl, Jaysree (Swapna) and his love interest, Sridevi (Rajyalakshmi). Rosamma George won the 1981 Filmfare Award for Best Film - Malayalam for this film.

Plot
 
Das is a rich and spoilt playboy who drives to his bungalow in Kodaikanal with a callgirl Jaysree. The bungalow is looked after by caretaker Parameswaran and his Tamil wife Kannamma. Parameswaran has a son Gopan who stays away from the place and does guide work for foreigners. Parameswaran has told both of them that Jaysree is Das' wife to avoid ill-fame to the family name. Das feels he owns Jaysree and does not waste a single opportunity to ridicule her profession. Other than sex, there is no emotional bond between them.A family friend of Das' late father, Panikkar and family drop by to meet Das' wife which makes Das uncomfortable. Though Jaysree refuses at first to play the role, she then acts as a dutiful wife before them. Panikkar's family consists of his wife Chinnammu Amma, father-in-law Rao Bahadur Shankaramenon, and two daughters, elder one being Nirmala married to engineer Ramakrishnan and younger one Sridevi who is separated from her husband. Two relations build up simultaneously. On one side, Sridevi is able to bring back the fondness of music in Das and they spent time understanding each other. On the other side, Jaysree feels Gopan is like herself, a victim of helplessness and she becomes attached to him.

Things take a turn when, after a moment of passion, Jaysree tells the truth about herself to Gopan and he feels a revulsion towards her. Meanwhile, Das confesses his womanising nature to Sridevi and then proposes to her but she is unable to commit to him. Finally, Jaysree leaves the house and Gopan joins her in her journey. Sridevi's separated husband Vijayshankar apologises to her for his insensitive behaviour and she goes back to him. In the end, Das drives off from the place, all alone.

Cast

Mammootty as Das
Rajyalakshmi as Sreedevi
Swapna as Jayasree
Kaviyoor Ponnamma as Chinammu Amma
Beena Kumbalangi as Nirmala
Jose Prakash as Panikkar
Ratheesh as Vijayshankar
Sankaradi as Parameswaran
Rajkumar as Gopakumar
Lalu Alex as Ramakrishnan
Mallika Sukumaran as Kannamma 
Premji as Raobahadur Shankaramenon

Production
The film is Mammootty's first film in a leading role. Mammootty replaced Babu Namboothiri as lead actor just after 12 days of shooting. The film was shot extensivly in and around Kodaikanal.

Release
The film was released on 31 October 1981. The film was critically acclaimed and was a commercial success.

Soundtrack
The music was composed by Shyam and the lyrics were written by Bichu Thirumala. The film's songs were chartbusters.

Awards
Filmfare Award for Best Film - Malayalam won by Rosamma George (1981)

References

External links
 

1981 films
1980s Malayalam-language films
Films shot in Kodaikanal
Films directed by I. V. Sasi
Films scored by Shyam (composer)